Marie O'Regan is a British horror writer and editor.

Biography
Marie O'Regan is based in Derbyshire where she is the co-editor of  a number of books and has written for horror magazines including Fortean Times, Rue Morgue, and DeathRay and had her short stories anthologised. O'Regan, with her husband Paul Kane, has also published a book of interviews with horror writers. She was the Chairperson of the British Fantasy Society for four years (2004-2008) as well as the co-chair of the UK Chapter of the Horror Writers' Association. She has been chair of StokerCon UK with the convention due in April 2020.  She conducts workshops and tutors students. O'Regan has edited books highlighting authors such as Clive Barker, Neil Gaiman, Brian Aldiss and Muriel Gray.

Bibliography

Books
 Mirror Mere
 Bury Them Deep
 In Times of Want and Other Stories
 The Last Ghost and Other Stories
 Voices in the Dark (2010)

Anthologies
 Hellbound Hearts
 The Mammoth Book of Body Horror
 Carnivale: Dark Tales From the Fairground
 The Mammoth Book of Ghost Stories by Women
 Phantoms
 Exit Wounds
 Wonderland

References 

Year of birth missing (living people)
People from Derbyshire
21st-century English women writers
English book editors
British women editors
Living people
Women horror writers
English horror writers